"Long Live" is a song written and recorded by American singer-songwriter Taylor Swift for her third studio album, Speak Now (2010). Produced by Swift and Nathan Chapman, "Long Live" is a heartland rock song featuring girl group harmonies and chiming rock guitars. The lyrics are about Swift's gratitude for her fans and bandmates, using high-school and royalty imagery to describe the accomplishments in the narrator's life.

After Speak Now was released, "Long Live" entered and peaked at number 85 on the US Billboard Hot 100. Some music critics deemed it an album highlight and lauded the production and lyrics, but others felt it was generic and unmemorable. A remix featuring verses written and sung in Portuguese by Brazilian singer Paula Fernandes, accompanied by a music video, was released as a digital single in Brazil in January 2012 to promote the live album Speak Now World Tour – Live; it peaked at number five on the Brasil Hot 100 Airplay chart.

Swift included the song on the set lists of two of her world tours, the Speak Now World Tour (2011–2012) and Reputation Stadium Tour (2018), and performed it on select dates of two of her world tours, the Red Tour (2013–2014) and the 1989 World Tour (2015).

Composition
American singer-songwriter Taylor Swift released her third studio album, Speak Now, on October 25, 2010. She wrote all 14 tracks on the standard album by herself and co-produced them with Nathan Chapman. "Long Live" is the closing track of Speak Now 14-track standard edition. Musically, "Long Live" is a heartland rock song, featuring contemporary country elements, chiming rock guitars, loud cymbal beats, and girl group harmonies. Rob Sheffield in Rolling Stone compared the song's guitars to those on "Hysteria" by Def Leppard. Musicologist James E. Perone compared the song's production to rock music from the 1980s, specifically the music of Irish band U2.

Lyrical interpretation
Swift dedicated "Long Live" to her bandmates and fans. The lyrics celebrate moments of triumph in the narrator's life, featuring royalty (kings and queens) and high school imagery ("You traded your baseball cap for a crown / And they gave us our trophies / And we held them up for our towns") to describe the accomplishments in life. The narrator describes herself as a queen who, with a king by her side, fights dragons to protect her kingdom. Swift also acknowledges that her triumph will fade some day, and there are bittersweet and poignant moments ("If you have children someday, when they point to the pictures, please tell them my name"). Towards the end, Swift sings, "Will you take a moment / Promise me this / That you'll stand by me forever," which Billboard interpreted as her message to her fans. Perone commented that the lyrical theme of overcoming odds to achieve victory, coupled with the "near anthem-like structure", resembles David Bowie's 1977 classic "Heroes". Brittany Spanos from Rolling Stone agreed with this interpretation, saying that "Long Live" throws back to "Heroes" by how "it portrays two lovers who have amicably parted ways but not without leaving an unforgettable mark on one another".

In Vulture, Nate Jones commented that despite Swift's intention to dedicate the track to her bandmates and fans, the "adolescent self-mythologizing" lyrics are universal enough to be taken as a graduation song. Jonathan Keefe from Slant Magazine commented that the track features fairy-tale imagery recalling Swift's 2008 album Fearless. In an analysis for the New Statesman, Anna Leszkiewicz deemed the imagery of crowns, kings, and queens in "Long Live" a representation of Swift's optimism towards her life and career, and her earnestness with her fans. Leszkiewicz noted that in some of Swift's later songs, such as "Blank Space" (2014) and "Call It What You Want" (2017), the imagery became darker and represented the pitfalls of celebrity. Some lyrics of the song are included in one of Swift's journal entries from June 2010, printed in the liner notes of her 2019 studio album Lover.

Live performances

Swift's first live performance of "Long Live" was for an NBC Speak Now Thanksgiving Special, which broadcast on November 25, 2010. The television special showcased the making of the album along with live performances on a rooftop in New York City. She also included the song as part of the set list of the Speak Now World Tour, performing it as the last song before the encore.

Swift performed "Long Live" on select dates of her later tour, including the Red Tour (Vancouver, June 2013), and the 1989 World Tour (Melbourne, third night, December 2015). On her Reputation Stadium Tour (2018), she performed a mashup of "Long Live" and "New Year's Day" on piano.

Reception
After Speak Now was released, "Long Live" debuted and peaked at number 85 on the US Billboard Hot 100. In a review of Speak Now for Rolling Stone, Sheffield called it "a ridiculously over-the-top prom anthem". He ranked it sixth on his list ranking all songs in Swift's discography, calling it "a song nobody else could have written, as she rides those power chords home". In BBC Music, Matthew Horton noted the track as an example of Swift's maturing songwriting. In a 2021 retrospective for Consequence, Natalia Barr picked "Long Live" as the best song from Speak Now, lauding its anthemic production and lyrical sentiments and opined that it "has only gotten better with time". Comparing the song favorably to "Change" from Fearless, PopMatters editor Dave Heaton felt the song was somewhat generic, but that the ambiguity of its subject matter strengthens its appeal as an anthem. Spanos picked it among the 10 best deep cuts in Swift's discography, writing: "Swift can make falling in love sound like every holiday is happening at once."

On a less positive side, Keefe believed that the high-school imagery showcased Swift's lack of repertoire in her songwriting. In her review for HitFix, Melinda Newman deemed "Long Live" too long and lyrically unsophisticated compared to the sharper lyricism of other tracks. Mikael Wood from Spin selected the song as one of Speak Now most forgettable, alongside "Sparks Fly". NME Hannah Mylrea, in a 2020 ranking of Swift's catalog, regarded "Long Live" as a generic filler on Speak Now.

Paula Fernandes version
In 2012, Swift recorded and released a new version of "Long Live" featuring Brazilian singer Paula Fernandes. It features Portuguese verses written and sung by Fernandes, and was released to promote the Brazilian edition of Swift's 2011 live album, Speak Now World Tour – Live. The version was released onto the Brazilian iTunes Store on January 3, 2012, through Universal Music Group.

The music video for the song, directed by Eduardo Levy, includes scenes of Fernandes singing the song in a studio in Brazil and Swift performing it during a U.S. concert. In Billboard, Taylor Weatherby praised Fernandes's deeper vocals complementing Swift's lighter tones. Swift and Fernandes performed the song live at a Rio de Janeiro concert held at Citibank Hall on September 13, 2012. The version featuring Fernandes reached the top five on Billboard Brasil Hot 100 Airplay chart. "Long Live" was later included on Fernandes's studio album Meus Encantos (2012) as a bonus track, and her live album Multishow Ao Vivo: Um Ser Amor (2013).

Charts

Notes

References

Source

2010s ballads
2010 songs
Live singles
Rock ballads
Taylor Swift songs
Song recordings produced by Nathan Chapman (record producer)
Songs written by Taylor Swift
Song recordings produced by Taylor Swift
Heartland rock songs